Eric Corton (born 11 January 1969 in Oosterbeek) is a Dutch presenter, actor, author and diskjockey. He is the face of the annual multi-media charity event Serious Request.

Career 
Eric Corton is an educated actor on the Maastricht Academy of Dramatic Arts, but he is a common celebrity and television personality in the Netherlands, not specifically known as an actor. He sang and played guitar for the now extinct bands Eric Corton Trio and Tacker. Despite his thorough acting background, Eric got known as a diskjockey at Dutch radio station 3FM before anything else, while his characteristic voice was used in numerous commercials too.

Acting 
In 1995 Corton featured in the Veronica-series '20 Plus'. He met his wife Diana Sno on the set of that show. He was also part of the a comedy company called Purper, which played in theaters. He has also played in several Dutch movies and television series, but due to other commitments these have not been big, substantial roles. Most characters he played were either for his warm voice, or his typical masculine appearance.

He did bring his theater and acting experience to the spotlight already, but not with great acknowledgment. That would rapidly change when in 2012 he got cast for the series Penoza, alongside the much laurelled actress Monic Hendrickx, in a cast featuring several top-rated actors in the Netherlands. In the series, he plays the character of John de Weerd, a big-hearted, withdrawn and loving man, who would not harm a fly, but who is married to a Carmen (played by Monic Hendrickx) who gets dragged deeper and deeper into the world of the international organized crime against her own will, due to the mistakes her late husband and brother had made. The character of John strongly disapproves of the actions his wife has to take, but he lets her, out of his eyesight. In the meanwhile he takes care of both her and his sons from prior relationships, as well as Camen's orphaned grandson.

Presenting
In 2002 and 2003 Eric was the voice over for Robot Wars: The Dutch Battles, a spin-off from the British television show.

He also presented ‘De Garage’ for another broadcaster than BNN, namely VPRO and several radio shows.

DJ 
Eric is a well-known radio host and DJ. Partly due to his remarkable features, among which several tattoos, including on his hands, he is embraced by the Dutch rock scene, more than any other radio DJ. He is also an avid supporter of live music, using his radio station to promote Dutch live bands on any given occasion. One of the bands that profited from Eric's support is Voicst, which he aired on any occasion for a long period of time on his radio shows.

Music 
Eric is a well-known rock fan and has testified on this in several interviews. He was a guest as fan of Queens of the Stone Age on Dutch television show De Wereld Draait Door, which is the biggest daily talkshow of the Netherlands. The same report also featured politician Esther Ouwehand.

Eric has had a career as a musician himself too. The highlight in Eric's career was his band Tacker.
 He also was part of the eponymous band Eric Corton Trio

He also shared the stage with Seasick Steve and the Belgian rockband Triggerfinger at the Pinkpop Festival, being humorously announced as "the most handsome grey man from Holland", by Triggerfinger singer Ruben Blok.

Eric Corton is co-initiator of Cortonville, a live music platform for Dutch musicians, including albumreviews, interviews, reports, backgrounds, concertregistrations. Cortonville also organizes music events and small tours, in which new and coming bands are often given a change to display themselves to bigger audiences they would have had by their own power.

Writing
Eric Corton has a big love for cars. He has owned many cars and said about this on Dutch television: I can fall in love with a car, but when I see another one I fall in love with, my current car has to go. That's my form of infidelity like a rock star, while I treat my actual wife with a lot more respect and devotion. He wrote down a lifetime of stories, following the cars he then possessed, suitably dubbed ‘Eric Corton: Auto-Biography’, which was released in 2013.

He had written a lesser known book before in 2010, named ‘Wilde Wereld’ (which means "wild world"), about African Stories. This was Eric's debut as an author and it displays the stories, often very touching of nature, he heard by African children for his work as ambassador for The Red Cross.

Trivia
In 2011 he received the "Pop Media Award". The jury described him as a "musician, DJ, program maker, tv-presenter, and an advocate for alternative music on stations that usually don't pay attention to is in particular".

He officially married a couple as a special Civil registry servant. He did this in 2007, in the Glass House, after an auction for Serious Request.

Eric Corton is an official The Red Cross ambassador. He travels to Africa to show the Dutch viewers what this year's theme for Serious request is and why it is important. This gave him the officious title "mister Serious Request".

Despite being born in 1969 he works for BNN, which explicitly aims at a teenage and young adult audience. Besides hosting shows, he is the voice-over or announcement voice for most of the BNN radio and television shows.

He was a candidate for the Dutch House of Representatives in 2021 for the GreenLeft party, running as a lijstduwer.

Private life
Eric Corton is married to actress Diana Sno. The couple has one son and a daughter.

Eric was born in Oosterbeek, near Arnhem, but now resides in Amsterdam.

References

External links
BNN Face: Eric Corton

Cortonville

1969 births
Living people
Dutch male actors
Dutch male film actors
Dutch male television actors
Dutch rock singers
Dutch male singers
Dutch radio personalities
Dutch male writers
People from Renkum